Telmatobius mantaro is a species of frog in the family Telmatobiidae. It is endemic to the eastern Cordillera Central of the Peruvian Andes. The specific name mantaro refers to the Mantaro River running near the type locality.

Description
Adult males in the type series measure  in snout–vent length. The largest female in the type seriest, a subadult, measures  SVL. The head is slightly wider than it is long. The snout is rounded in lateral view and subtriangular in dorsal view. The tympanum is distinct and the supratympanic fold is well-developed. The fingers have swollen tips and short dermal lateral fringes. The toes are moderately webbed and have spherical tips. The body is generally dark green to brown, with yellow to orange blotches or marbling on limbs. The venter is dull gray with pale brown pale spots and reticulations or purplish–brown. The iris is brown-bronze and the pupil has a yellow-orange ring.

A Gosner stage 35 tadpole measures  in total length, of which body makes . The body is slightly dorso-ventrally depressed and oval in dorsal view. The tail is muscular.

Habitat
The surroundings represent a range of vegetation types, from humid to dry montane forests to dense montane shrub surrounded by croplands.

Conservation
As of February 2022, this species has not been included in the IUCN Red List of Threatened Species. Ttito and colleagues suggest that it should be classified as "critically endangered" because of its likely small total population size and the threat posed by chytridiomycosis.

References

mantaro
Amphibians of the Andes
Amphibians of Peru
Endemic fauna of Peru
Amphibians described in 2016
Taxa named by Juan Carlos Chaparro
Taxa named by Ignacio J. De la Riva
Taxa named by Pablo J. Venegas